The 'Gyffard' Partbooks (British Library [GB-Lbl] Add. MS 17802–5; also spelled Giffard) are an important set of English Renaissance choral partbooks, containing pieces by composers such as Thomas Tallis and John Sheppard, as well as additional unnamed composers, which are not found in other sources.

This set of four partbooks were probably mostly copied during the reign of Mary I for use at St. Paul's Cathedral, but copying continued to ca. 1580. They are named after one of their early owners, Philip Gyffard.

Contents
The collection consists of mostly four-voice sacred a cappella choral music (though there are some 3- and 5-voice pieces). The music is arranged liturgically, and groups of similar pieces are also arranged by the seniority of the composer. It contains the following pieces:

See also

 Eton Choirbook
 Lambeth Choirbook
 Caius Choirbook
 Peterhouse partbooks
 The Mulliner Book, an instrumental collection
 List of Renaissance composers

References

Sources
 The Gyffard Partbooks I and II edited by David Mateer. EARLY ENGLISH CHURCH MUSIC Volumes 48 and 51 (London: Stainer & Bell, 2007 and 2009)
 Roger Bray, 'British Museum Add. MSS. 17802-5 (The Gyffard Part-Books): An Index and Commentary', Royal Musical Association Research Chronicle 7 (1969), 31-50
 David Mateer, 'The "Gyffard" Partbooks: Composers, Owners, Date and Provenance', Royal Musical Association Research Chronicle 28 (1995), 21-50

External links
 Table of Contents for Stainer & Bell's Gyffard Partbook compilations

 Playlist of available works from the Gyffard partbooks on American Spotify
 Source description in DIAMM

15th-century books

Renaissance music
Books on English music
Renaissance music manuscript sources